Eli Herring (born 1969) is a former Brigham Young University (BYU) offensive tackle who decided not to play in the National Football League (NFL) for religious reasons involving working on the Sabbath and made his intention clear to all NFL teams prior to the 1995 NFL draft.  Nonetheless, the devout member of the Church of Jesus Christ of Latter-day Saints was drafted in the 6th round by the Oakland Raiders.  He is one of few people to get drafted in the NFL after declaring an intention never to play. He is now married with seven children and works as a school teacher and assistant football coach at Mountain View High School in Orem, Utah.

High school
During his years at Springville High School, Herring participated and lettered in football, basketball, wrestling and track.  He earned All-Region and All-State honors in football and wrestling, while also setting two state records in track and becoming the Utah state champion in the shot put and discus. He was the captain of the football team, and was a member of the 1985 team that won the state championship He was recruited to play football by BYU, the University of Utah, Utah State University, Stanford University and the University of Washington, but enrolled at BYU in 1987 because it was the only school that did not withdraw a scholarship offer when he announced his plans to serve a mission for the Church of Jesus Christ of Latter-day Saints (LDS Church).

LDS Mission
Following his freshman year at BYU, Herring served an LDS Church mission in Salta, Argentina from 1988 to 1990. While he was there he read about Erroll Bennett, a professional soccer player in Tahiti, who withdrew from his team after joining the LDS Church and deciding not to play on the Sabbath. Herring was impressed by Bennett's commitment and dedication to what he viewed was right.

Herring's views on money were also affected by his time in Argentina. When he arrived there one U.S. dollar was worth 15 Argentine australs, but by the time he left, a dollar was worth about 10,000 australs. This period of hyper-inflation helped him realize he could not trust in money nor make decisions solely based on money.

College
Unlike some returned missionaries, Herring came back from his two-year mission stronger, faster, more coordinated, and even more ready to play football. By his senior season he stood 6 feet 8 and weighed 330 pounds. Herring, who wore the number 76, played offensive tackle at BYU during the 1987, and 1991-94 seasons, earning honorable mention All-WAC in 1993 and second team All-WAC honors in 1994. He was selected to the Hula Bowl squad during his senior season. He was also a member of the BYU track team. In addition to football, Herring got married during his time at BYU and he earned a bachelor's degree in mathematics.

Decision not to play professional football
Projected as a first to third round draft choice, Herring made the decision to forgo a professional career so he wouldn't have to work on the Sabbath, and wrote letters to each NFL team saying as much. He was still drafted in the sixth round of the 1995 NFL draft by the Oakland Raiders, and Raider senior assistant Bruce Allen flew to Provo and offered Herring a three-year, $1.5 million contract. Herring rejected it. His starting salary as a teacher at Mountain View High School was around $22,000 a year.

Personal
Eli met his wife, Jennifer Anderson, at church while at BYU, and they married in July 1992. They now have seven children. He is now a school teacher and assistant football coach at Mountain View High School in Orem, Utah. His parents are David and Lynn Herring. Herring's younger brother, Isaac, also played on BYU's offensive line from 1999 to 2002.

Since January 2013, Herring has been serving in the LDS Church as a counselor to the president of the Orem Utah Sharon Park Stake. He previously served as a bishop for seven years.

References

1969 births
Living people
American Mormon missionaries in Argentina
Latter Day Saints from Utah
Sportspeople from Orem, Utah
American football offensive tackles
BYU Cougars football players
20th-century Mormon missionaries
High school football coaches in Utah